Bogusław Bosak (born 6 July 1968 in Krosno) is a Polish politician. He was elected to the Sejm on 25 September 2005, getting 2607 votes in 13 Kraków district as a candidate from the Law and Justice list.

See also
Members of Polish Sejm 2005-2007

External links
Bogusław Bosak - parliamentary page - includes declarations of interest, voting record, and transcripts of speeches.

1968 births
Living people
People from Krosno
Members of the Polish Sejm 2005–2007
Law and Justice politicians